Confidente de secundaria, is a Mexican telenovela produced by Luis de Llano Macedo for Televisa and broadcast in 1996 by Canal de las Estrellas.

The series stars Alexis Ayala as Quico, Irán Castillo as Jackie and Flavio César as Héctor.

Synopsis
Confidente de secundaria tells the story about the lives of some Mexican high school students which are linked through a famous radio show.

Cast

Main 

 Alexis Ayala as Quico
 Irán Castillo as Jackie
 Flavio César as Héctor

Recurring 
 Julio Alemán as Simón
 Luis Gimeno as Ulises
 Hilda Aguirre as Marcela
 Margarita Isabel as Soledad
 Sergio Ramos as Eladio
 Ofelia Cano as Adriana
 Karyme Lozano as Marilú
 Charlie as Marcos
 Nora Salinas as Bianca
 Francesca Guillén as Belén 
 Gerardo Quiroz as Polo
 Enrique Borja Baena as Yeyo
 María Luisa Alcalá as Connie
 Ricardo de Pascual as Anselmo
 Aurora Alonso as Delia
 José Luis Cordero as Apolonio
 Diego Schoening as Roberto
 Martha Aguayo as Mónica
 Beatriz Aguirre as Dinorah
 Julieta Rosen as Cristina
 Gustavo Rojo as Miramontes
 Alejandra Barros as Laura

References

External links 

1996 telenovelas
Mexican telenovelas
1996 Mexican television series debuts
1996 Mexican television series endings
Televisa telenovelas
Spanish-language telenovelas